The Zhejiang Guangsha Lions are a Chinese professional basketball team based in Hangzhou, Zhejiang, which plays in the North Division of the Chinese Basketball Association. Guangsha is the name of the club's corporate sponsor, but to prevent confusion with the older Zhejiang Golden Bulls, many Chinese websites refer to the team as the Guangsha Lions. This is to avoid the issue of having two Zhejiang clubs on the same list when team names are shown in shortform, with Guangsha becoming the "geographical" designation, as Hangzhou seems to not be an option.

Roster

Notable players

 Gabe Muoneke (2006–2007)
 Rodney White (2007–2010, 2012)
 Jin Lipeng (2008–2010, 2011–2013)
 Kasib Powell (2008)
 Lin Chih-chieh (2009–)
 Jelani McCoy (2009)
 Peter John Ramos (2009–2013)
 Javaris Crittenton (2010)
 Tre Kelley (2010–2011)
 Rafer Alston (2011)
 Dwayne Jones (2011)
 Walker Russell Jr. (2011)
 Wu Tai-hao (2011–2012)
 Wilson Chandler (2011–2012, 2020)
 Al Thornton (2012)
 Gary Forbes (2012–2013)
 Jonathan Gibson (2013–2014)
 Johan Petro (2013–2014)
 Chris Johnson (2013–2014)
 Hu Jinqiu (2013–present)
 Jamaal Franklin (2014–2015)
 Eli Holman (2014–2017)
 Kevin Murphy (2015)
 Jeremy Pargo (2015–2016)
 Sun Minghui (2015–present)
 Zhao Yanhao (2015–present)
 Ioannis Bourousis (2017–2018)
 Courtney Fortson (2017–2019)

References

External links
Official site 

 
Basketball teams established in 2005
Sport in Hangzhou
Chinese Basketball Association teams
2005 establishments in China